Pseudotypocerus is a genus of beetles in the family Cerambycidae, containing the following species:

 Pseudotypocerus ater Chemsak & Linsley, 1981
 Pseudotypocerus inflaticollis Chemsak & Linsley, 1976
 Pseudotypocerus nitidicollis Chemsak & Linsley, 1976
 Pseudotypocerus proxater Giesbert, 1997
 Pseudotypocerus pubipennis Bates, 1885
 Pseudotypocerus rufiventris (Bates, 1872)
 Pseudotypocerus virescens Chemsak & Linsley, 1976

References

Lepturinae